Westport is a city in Grays Harbor County, Washington, United States. It had a population of 2,213 at the 2020 census. Westport is located on a peninsula on the south side of the entrance to Grays Harbor from the Pacific Ocean.

The public Westport Marina is the largest marina on the outer coast of the United States's Pacific Northwest. The marina is home to a large commercial fishing fleet and several recreational charter fishing vessels. A summer-only passenger ferry, discontinued in 2008, previously connected the town to Ocean Shores, across the mouth of the harbor to the north. It is home to the Washington Tuna Classic ,which happens each August.

History
Westport was officially incorporated on June 26, 1914.  Names for the area in the past include Peterson's Point, Chehalis City, and Fort Chehalis.  The latter name is for a U.S. Army fort established in 1860 before the town was founded, "ts-a-lis" is the Lower Chehalis word for Westport, meaning "place of sand". Early explorers pronounced the word "Chehalis" and gave this name to the river and the people living up river who later became the Chehalis people or "People of the Sands". The area was used regularly during the summer by local Native American tribes (most likely the Shoalwater Bay Tribe, comprising Willapa Chinook and Lower Chehalis people) before Thomas Barker Speake and his family arrived early in the summer of 1857. Westport is also the home to a station for the US Coast Guard. In 2015, the Ocosta School District became the first to build a publicly funded vertical tsunami shelter, located at Ocosta Elementary School.

Geography
Westport is located at  (46.890803, -124.109926). It is the westernmost "Westport" in the world, the nearest competitor being in California, less than a degree east.

A weather station in Grayland, a community just south of Westport, has recorded conditions in the area going back to 1948. (See Grayland, Washington for climate data.)

Demographics

2010 census
At the 2010 census there were 2,099 people, 999 households, and 527 families living in the city. The racial makeup of the city was 87.0% White, 0.9% African American, 2.9% Native American, 1.1% Asian, 4.5% from other races, and 3.6% from two or more races. Hispanic or Latino of any race were 7.3%.

Of the 999 households 21.6% had children under the age of 18 living with them, 37.4% were married couples living together, 9.9% had a female householder with no husband present, 5.4% had a male householder with no wife present, and 47.2% were non-families. 38.2% of households were one person and 16.2% were one person aged 65 or older. The average household size was 2.10 and the average family size was 2.72.

The median age was 48.4 years. 18.8% of residents were under the age of 18; 7.2% were between the ages of 18 and 24; 19.8% were from 25 to 44; 32.9% were from 45 to 64; and 21.3% were 65 or older. The gender makeup of the city was 50.7% male and 49.3% female.

2000 census
At the 2000 census, there were 2,137 people, 983 households, and 547 families living in the city. The population density was 592.9 people per square mile (229.2/km). There were 1,358 housing units at an average density of 376.8 per square mile (145.6/km). The racial makeup of the city was 92.75% White, 0.33% African American, 3.09% Native American, 0.94% Asian, 0.05% Pacific Islander, 0.47% from other races, and 2.39% from two or more races. Hispanic or Latino of any race were 2.99% of the population. 21.7% were of German, 10.9% English, 9.6% Irish, 7.6% Norwegian, 5.3% American and 5.1% Swedish ancestry.

Of the 983 households 23.2% had children under the age of 18 living with them, 42.9% were married couples living together, 8.7% had a female householder with no husband present, and 44.3% were non-families. 34.8% of households were one person and 14.8% were one person aged 65 or older. The average household size was 2.16 and the average family size was 2.79.

The age distribution was 22.0% under the age of 18, 6.7% from 18 to 24, 24.8% from 25 to 44, 27.3% from 45 to 64, and 19.1% 65 or older. The median age was 43 years. For every 100 females, there were 98.1 males. For every 100 females age 18 and over, there were 91.9 males.

The median household income was $32,037 and the median family income was $40,037. Males had a median income of $33,173 versus $23,889 for females. The per capita income for the city was $17,362. About 9.0% of families and 14.3% of the population were below the poverty line, including 23.4% of those under age 18 and 4.6% of those age 65 or over.

Gallery

References

External links

Official Website
Westport Washington - Business Listings, Events Schedule, Images, Classifieds, Weather and more

Cities in Washington (state)
Cities in Grays Harbor County, Washington
Populated coastal places in Washington (state)